The Lesse is a river in the Ardennes, in the Walloon region of Belgium. It is a right tributary to the river Meuse.

The source of the Lesse is near Libramont-Chevigny, in the Belgian province of Luxembourg. The Lesse flows roughly in north-western direction. Near Han-sur-Lesse (municipality of Rochefort) the entire river goes underground, flowing through limestone caves. Many of the caves along the banks of the Lesse are important archaeological sites; these include the Trou de Chaleux (by the Cirque de Chaleux), and the Trou des Nutons and Trou du Frontal at Furfooz. The Lesse flows into the river Meuse in the village of Anseremme, municipality of Dinant. Towns along the Lesse are Daverdisse, Han-sur-Lesse, Houyet and Anseremme.

Subterranean rivers
Rivers of the Ardennes (Belgium)
Rivers of Belgium
Rivers of Wallonia
Rivers of Luxembourg (Belgium)
Rivers of Namur (province)
Dinant
Libramont-Chevigny
Rochefort, Belgium